The dusky dancer (Argia translata) is a damselfly of the family Coenagrionidae, native to eastern and southern North America.

References

External links
 Argia translata photos
 Argia translata at AzOdes

Coenagrionidae
Insects described in 1865